Cryptochorina polychroia is a moth of the family Geometridae. It is found in Taiwan.

References

Moths described in 1941
Gnophini
Moths of Taiwan